This is a list of agencies, corporations, departments and authorities that are part of the Government of Western Australia.

Departments, agencies, corporations and authorities 
List of departments, agencies, corporations and authorities:

A
Starting with A:
 Albany Port Authority
 Western Australian Alcohol and Drug Authority
 Animal Resources Authority
 Arena Joondalup
 Art Gallery of Western Australia

B
Starting with B:
 Botanic Gardens and Parks Authority
 Broome Port Authority
 Builders Registration Board of WA
 Building and Construction Industry Training Fund
 Building Disputes Tribunal
 Bunbury Port Authority
 Bunbury Water Board
 Burswood Park Board
 Busselton Water Board

C
Starting with C:
 C. Y. O'Connor Institute
 Central TAFE
 Central West TAFE
 Challenge Stadium
 Challenger TAFE
 ChemCentre
 Childrens Court
 Commissioner for Children and Young People
 Commissioner for Occupational Safety and Health
 Conservation Commission
 Corruption and Crime Commission
 Country Housing Authority
 Curriculum Council
 Curtin University of Technology

D
Starting with D:
 Dampier Port Authority
 Department of Biodiversity, Conservation and Attractions
 Department of Communities
 Department of Education
 Department of Finance
 Department of Fire and Emergency Services
 Department of Health
 Department of Jobs, Tourism, Science and Innovation
 Department of Justice
 Department of Local Government, Sport & Cultural Industries
 Department of Mines, Industry Regulation and Safety
 Department of Planning, Lands & Heritage
 Department of Premier and Cabinet
 Department of Primary Industries and Regional Development
 Department of the Registrar Western Australian Industrial Relations Commission
 Department of Training and Workforce Development
 Department of Transport
 Department of Treasury
 Department of Water and Environmental Regulation 
 Director of Equal Opportunity in Public Employment
 Disability Services Commission
 District Court of Western Australia
 Drug and Alcohol Office

E
Starting with E:
 Economic Regulation Authority (WA)
 Edith Cowan University
 Electoral Commission, Western Australian
 Electorate Offices
 Electricity Generation Corporation
 Electricity Networks Corporation
 Electricity Retail Corporation
 Equal Opportunity Commission
 Esperance Port Authority

F
Starting with F:
 Family and Domestic Violence Unit
 Family Court of Western Australia
 Fire and Emergency Services Authority
 Forest Products Commission
 Fremantle Port Authority

G
Starting with G:
 Gas Disputes Arbitrator, Western Australia
 Gascoyne Development Commission
 Gold Corporation
 Goldfields Esperance Development Commission
 Government Employees Superannuation Board
 Governor of Western Australia
 Great Southern Development Commission
 Great Southern TAFE
 Greyhound Racing Association, Western Australian

H
Starting with H:
 Hairdressers Registration Board of WA
 Health Promotion Foundation Western Australia
 Heritage Council of Western Australia
 Horizon Power
 Housing Authority

I
Starting with I:
 Independent Market Operator
 Insurance Commission of Western Australia

K
Starting with K:
 Kimberley Development Commission
 Kimberley TAFE

L
Starting with L:
 Land Surveyors Licensing Board
 LandCorp
 Law Compass
 Law Reform Commission of Western Australia
 Legal Aid Western Australia
 Legal Practice Board
 Legislative Assembly
 Legislative Council
 Liquor Commission of Western Australia
 Lotterywest

M
Starting with M:
 Main Roads Western Australia
 Mental Health Commission
 Metropolitan Cemeteries Board
 Metropolitan Redevelopment Authority
 Mid West Development Commission
 Midvale SpeedDome
 Minerals and Energy Research Institute of Western Australia
 Murdoch University

N
Starting with N:
 Nurses and Midwives Board of Western Australia
 North Metropolitan TAFE

O
Starting with O:
 Office of Aboriginal Health
 Office of the Appeals Convenor
 Office of the Auditor General
 Office of the Chief Nursing Officer
 Office of Chief Psychiatrist
 Office for Children & Youth
 Office of Crime Prevention
 Office of the Custodial Inspector
 Office of Development Approvals Coordination
 Office of the Director of Public Prosecutions
 Office of E-Government
 Office of Energy
 Office of Equal Employment Opportunity
 Office of Government Procurement
 Office of Health Review
 Office of the Information Commissioner
 Office of the Inspector of Custodial Services
 Office of Multicultural Interests
 Office of Native Title
 Office of the Ombudsman
 Office of Population Health Genomics
 Office of the Public Advocate
 Office of the Public Sector Standards Commissioner
 Office of Road Safety
 Office of Safety and Quality in Health Care
 Office of Shared Services
 Office of the State Coroner
 Office of State Revenue
 Office of State Security and Emergency Coordination
 Office of Training Accreditation Council
 Office for Women's Policy
 Office for Youth

P
Starting with P:
 Painters Registration Board
 Parliament of Western Australia
 Parliamentary Commissioner for Administrative Investigations
 Parliamentary Inspector of the Corruption and Crime Commission
 Parliamentary Services Department
 Peel Development Commission
 Perth Market Authority
 Perth Motorplex
 Perth Observatory
 Perth Theatre Trust
 Pharmaceutical Council of Western Australia
 Pilbara Development Commission
 Pilbara TAFE
 Western Australian Planning Commission
 Port Hedland Port Authority
 Potato Marketing Corporation of Western Australia
 Public Sector Commission
 Public Transport Authority
 Public Trust Office

R
Starting with R:
 Racing and Wagering Western Australia
 Regional Power Corporation
 River Guardians
 Rockingham Development Office
 Rottnest Island Authority
 Rural Business Development Corporation

S
Starting with S:
 Salaries and Allowances Tribunal
 School Curriculum and Standards Authority
 ScreenWest
 Seniors Card Centre
 Seniors Contact
 Small Business Development Corporation
 Small Business Solutions
 Solicitor General
 South West Development Commission
 South West Institute of Technology
 State Administrative Tribunal
 State Law Publisher
 State Library of Western Australia
 State Records Office of Western Australia
 Supreme Court of Western Australia
 Sustainable Energy Development Office
 Swan River Trust
 Swan TAFE
 Synergy Energy

T
Starting with T:
 Teacher Registration Board of Western Australia
 The National Trust of Australia (Western Australia)
 The University of Western Australia
 Transperth
 TransWA

V
Starting with V:
 Valuer General
 VenuesWest
 Verve Energy
 Veterinary Surgeons Board

W
Starting with W:
 Waste Authority
 Water Corporation
 West Coast TAFE
 Western Australia Gas Disputes Arbitrator
 Western Australia Police Service
 Western Australian Alcohol and Drug Authority
 Western Australian Building Management Authority
 Western Australian College of Teaching
 Western Australian Electoral Commission
 Western Australian Greyhound Racing Association
 Western Australian Institute of Sport
 Western Australian Land Authority
 Western Australian Land Information Authority (Landgate)
 Western Australian Museum
 Western Australian Planning Commission
 Western Australian Tourism Commission
 Western Power Corporation
 Wheatbelt Development Commission
 WorkCover Western Australia Authority
 WorkSafe

Z
Starting with Z:
 Zoological Parks Authority

See also
List of Western Australian courts and tribunals

References

External links
 Homepage of the Western Australian Government

Western Australia
Government agencies